Brochymena is a genus of insects, sometimes known as the rough stink bugs. They belong to the shield bug family, and are easily confused with the similar-looking brown marmorated stink bug.

Species

References

External links
 Bugguide.net
 Video of Brochymena from Colorado

Pentatomidae genera
Pentatomomorpha genera
Taxa named by Charles Jean-Baptiste Amyot
Taxa named by Jean Guillaume Audinet-Serville
Halyini